Lambeth Road is a road in Lambeth (to the west) and Southwark (to the east), London running between Lambeth Bridge over the River Thames at the western end and St George's Circus at the eastern end. The road is designated the A3203. The borough boundary runs along it from the intersection with King Edward's Walk to Kennington Road.

Lambeth Palace, the London base of the Archbishop of Canterbury and the Museum of Garden History are to the north towards the west by the river. St George's Cathedral Southwark is on the north side. Opposite on the south side is the Imperial War Museum, originally the site of the notorious Dog and Duck tavern and later the Bethlem Royal Hospital, the world's oldest psychiatric hospital.

Lambeth Walk adjoins to the south in the middle. Other adjoining roads include the Albert Embankment and Lambeth Palace Road by the river, Kennington Road and St George's Road.

The remains of Saint John Jones were displayed on what is now Lambeth Road after his execution in 1598.

Famous residents 
 Archbishops of Canterbury, latterly at Lambeth Palace.
 Elias Ashmole, founder of the Ashmolean Museum in Oxford.
 Philip Astley (1742–1814), built and lived at Hercules Hall, after which Hercules Road is named.  He is acknowledged as the 'father of the modern circus'.
 William Blake (1757–1827), the poet and visionary artist, lived in Hercules Road, north off Lambeth Road. The location is marked with a plaque at 23 Hercules Road.
 William Bligh (1754–1817), captain of The Bounty and later an admiral, lived at 100 Lambeth Road.
 Emma Cons, socialist, educationalist and founder of the Old Vic Theatre, and her niece, Lilian Baylis, who re-established the Old Vic and Sadler's Wells, lived at 5–7 Morton Place, off Lambeth Road.
 Sir Ben Greet, the actor-manager, lived at 160 Lambeth Road (1920–36).
 Kevin Spacey (born 1959), artistic director at the Old Vic Theatre nearby, lives in the vicinity.
 John Tradescant the elder and his son of the same name, plant collectors.

See also notable patients of Bethlem hospital, including the artist Richard Dadd.

External links 
Lambeth Road and Hercules Road historical information from the Vauxhall Society
North Lambeth history
Survey of London entry (1951)

Streets in the London Borough of Southwark